Cattleya coccinea, also known as Sophronitis coccinea or Sophronitis grandiflora, is a species of orchid occurring in Atlantic Forest habitats, from southeastern Brazil to Argentina (Misiones).

See also
 List of plants of Atlantic Forest vegetation of Brazil

References

External links
 

coccinea
Orchids of Argentina
Orchids of Brazil
Flora of the Atlantic Forest
Flora of Misiones Province